This is a list of civil parishes in the ceremonial county of Surrey, England. There are 87 civil parishes.

Population figures are unavailable for some of the smallest parishes.

The whole of the districts of Woking, Epsom and Ewell, Spelthorne and Runnymede are unparished.
The whole of former districts of Walton and Weybridge Urban District, Guildford Municipal Borough, Leatherhead Urban District, Frimley and Camberley Urban District, Banstead Urban District and Reigate Municipal Borough are unparished. Parts of the former Esher Urban District and Dorking Urban District are unparished

See also
 List of civil parishes in England

References

External links
 Office for National Statistics : Geographical Area Listings
 Surrey County Council : Parishes by District

Civil parishes
Surrey
 
Civil parishes